Sonja de Lennart (born 21 May 1920) is a German fashion designer. In 1948, she invented Capri pants.

Early life
Sonja de Lennart was born in Prussia in May 1920, into a multicultural family as the daughter of an industrialist and syndicus. In her youth, she was a keen athlete in swimming and track and field. By the age of eight, de Lennart had already won many swimming competitions. In 1932, she participated in the official National Youth Competitions as an athlete in track and field running the 100 m and 1000 m sprint. She was an active member of the Classic Theater Society along with being a talented student of the Breslau State Opera ballet whose teacher was the famous dancer and ballet master, Anna Capana.

After attending business college in Breslau, her dream of becoming a fashion designer became a passion. She studied design despite her father’s extremely strong opposition and threat of disinheritance.  She secretly enrolled as a student apprentice at Erich Boehm Atelier and later at Herman Palm Atelier in Berlin in which she studied the skillful trade of tailoring and the customizing of garments – from elegant hats to evening gowns – until she became a master craftsman of her trade graduating as a textile engineer. After World War II, she was entered as a member into the prestigious Handwerksrolle of the Chamber of Trade. After the political regime had destroyed the family fortune, it was de Lennart who, after World War II, restored her family financially with her fashion design trade.

Fashion career

In 1945, after the war, Sonja de Lennart began to produce fashion wear and opened her first boutique, Salon Sonja, in Munich. Her fashion career began with a rare but fortunate circumstance when the fashion advisor of the Taylor's Guild, M. Ponater, allowed de Lennart to exhibit one of her first creations (a hand painted dress which she painted herself and displayed on a mannequin) in one corner of Ponater’s booth of the leading Fashion Trade Fair, Handwerksmesse, where he was displaying and selling his own fashion collection. This one and only opportunity to show her talent had customers standing in line to place orders for which she wasn’t prepared. This event turned into the beginning of the distribution of de Lennart’s creations. The demand for her designs was so overwhelming that soon after, the family began to manufacture another of her creations, imitation leather vestures, as well as three-quarter length coats that were exhibited at the Craftsman Fair and distributed nationwide becoming a bestseller.

In that same year, she created a wide-swinging skirt with a wide belt (which she modeled herself), a blouse, and hat. Her design collection became known as the Capri Collection. She chose this name as it was her family’s love for the island of Capri that captivated her together with a recorded song sent to her by her family in America called, "Isle of Capri". Her love for this song and her increased fondness for the Island of Capri, gave her the inspiration of the Capri name.

In 1948, after years of women wearing the typical wide and rather masculine pants, de Lennart created the sexy tight three-quarter length Capri pants with the stylish short slit on the outer-side of the pant leg. The original classic Capri Pants were designed in specific lengths for winter and summer wear. In 1949, German actress, Mady Rahl, and Austrian actress, Erni Mangold, both posed for Sonja de Lennart in the original summer- and winter-style Capri pant, respectively.

In 1952, Edith Head recognized the innovative and revolutionary style of Sonja de Lennart and had her Capri Collection [the wide-swinging Capri skirt, the high-neck Capri blouse, and the wide Capri belt and Capri pants] sewn by the Italian Fontana sisters for Audrey Hepburn in the movie, Roman Holiday. In 1953, Hubert de Givenchy had de Lennart's Capri pants stitched for Audrey Hepburn, which she wore in the movie Sabrina (1954).

Edith Head introduced the Capri skirt, Capri blouse, Capri pants, and Capri belt to the world; but, it was the Capri pants that made history. Among the many who have worn the fashionable Capri pants are Doris Day, Jane Russell, Katharine Hepburn, Gina Lollobrigida, Ava Gardner, Elizabeth Taylor, Jacqueline Kennedy, Marilyn Monroe, Kim Novak, Sophia Loren, Anita Ekberg, and Mary Tyler Moore. Capri pants marched even in the Existentialist Bars from Saint-Germain-des-Prés in Paris: “Young women loved themselves in black roll necks, tight Capri pants, and flatties [flat sandals] along with straight long hair and black-painted eyes a la Juliette Greco,” reported Professor Gundula Wolter (1994, 270).

Sonja de Lennart was also the first designer who utilized the famous Everglaze textile from America which her family from California sent to de Lennart upon her request. Subsequently, it developed into big business for the American manufacturer. The material was then licensed to European companies; as a result, foreign royalties accounted for more than 70 percent of the firm’s total profits.

In 1955 in Munich, Sonja de Lennart opened her new, much larger fashion house and renamed the company Maison Haase to include, in part, both her and her husband’s name. De Lennart’s fashion house became the place to be. Major movie companies, prominent opera directors, costume designers, and notables from all over the world traveled to Europe to acquire Sonja de Lennart's design. Among those were Ingrid Bergman, Gary Cooper, Maria Schell, Curd Jürgens, and Klaus Kinski as well as nobles like the Countess of Stauffenberg; the Woolworth heir, Sunny von Bülow; Princess Auersperg and Queen Soraya Esfandiary, the wife of Shah Mohammad Reza Pahlavi, The 5th Dimension, and many others.

De Lennart became one of the most innovative European fashion designers after World War II influencing a whole generation of new designers and was considered a leading pioneer of her time by major magazines wherein she was interviewed along with legendary fashion designers as Yves Saint Laurent, Paco Rabanne, and André Courrèges. There was almost no fashion designer who did not add Capri pants to their collection.

References

External links
Juli 2003 / sw Abbildung: The Fifties (Fashionsourcebooks), Paperback Verlag http://www.wasistwas.de/sport-kultur/alle-artikel/artikel/link//462cb9e5d0/article/die-caprihose-modisches-highlight-der-50er-jahre.html
Sonja de Lennart Official site
Der Grosse Brockhaus Lexikon/The Great Brockhaus (Bertelsmann Group) 2002–2007
Lexikon.Meyers.de/wissen/Caprihose Click here: Meyers Lexikonverlag |Suchergebnis [search result] für »sonja de lennart«
Jasmin magazine, Number 12/69, 06/09/69, Interview, http://www.guj.de/
Sonja de Lennart: Fashion Designer and Inventor of the famous Capri Pants Official site
AZ Abendzeitung, B1017A, 19 August 1955, "A household name of international fashion design....For 20 years Sonja worked as fashion designer in inland and foreign countries" http://abendzeitung.de
Freundin magazine 8/69, 8 April 1969 3Z3875C, p. 44, 45, 46, 47 http://www.freundin.de/
Abendzeitung, AZ, B1017A, February 7/8, 1955 http://abendzeitung.de
- Mueller Science/University of Zuerich - Caprihosen [Capri Pants] (invented by Sonja de Lennart 1948) (German)
SZ Newspaper Süddeutsche Zeitung, [206] 28 August 1959 ”Fashion Show---Eye Candy for Chubbies" http://sueddeutsche.de
Abendzeitung, AZ, B1017A, 9 August 2010 "A Life for the Capri-Pants" (portrait)
BILD, 117/20, C8495A, 20 May 2011, p. 6, http://www.bild.de/ (portrait)
Der Spiegel, Zeitgeschehen online, 16 May 2011 "Fashion Classics" http://www.spiegel.de/
Cosmopolitan, The Great Fashion Encyclopedia, "C like Capri pants" http://cosmopolitan.de
Jasmin magazine 26/69, 12/22/69 B8489, p. 29, http://www.guj.de/
Epoca magazine, 11/1967
Abendzeitung, AZ, 16/17, August 1969, B1017A http://abendzeitung.de
Jasmin magazine 25/69, December 8, 1969  B8489D p. 181, 182 http://www.guj.de/
Freundin magazine 17 December 1968, 26/68, 3Z3875D, p. 8 http://www.freundin.de/
Mady Rahl https://www.imdb.com

1920 births
Living people
German centenarians
German fashion designers
Women centenarians
German inventors
Women inventors
German women fashion designers